Foo Go is a brand of pre-packed sandwiches and other convenience food owned by Greencore Group plc, who acquired them in 2009 for £4.4 million. The company made £7 million in its first three years of operation.

Foo Go has a "zero waste" environment policy and has used water-based boards, inks, and coatings with packet windows made from 100% cornstarch instead of the normal oil-based inks and a plastic film, to make the packet totally biodegradable.

References

Food manufacturers of England
Companies based in Lincolnshire